Zebulon is a city in Pike County, Georgia, United States. The population was 1,174 at the 2010 census. The city is the county seat of Pike County. The city and county were named after explorer Zebulon Pike.

History
Zebulon was incorporated in 1825. The town was named after Zebulon Pike, a war hero and explorer.

Geography
Zebulon is  located at  (33.098970, -84.342140).

Soils in Zebulon have dark reddish brown loamy surface horizons over red to dark red clay and are mostly mapped as Davidson or Lloyd series.

Demographics

2000 census
As of the census of 2000, there were 1,181 people, 464 households, and 324 families residing in the city. The racial makeup of the city was 60.12% White, 36.92% African American, 0.08% Native American, 1.27% Asian, 0.68% from other races, and 0.93% from two or more races. Hispanic or Latino of any race were 1.95% of the population.

There were 464 households, out of which 36.0% had children under the age of 18 living with them, 43.1% were married couples living together, 22.4% had a female householder with no husband present, and 30.0% were non-families. 27.2% of all households were made up of individuals, and 12.1% had someone living alone who was 65 years of age or older.  The average household size was 2.50 and the average family size was 3.06.

In the city, the population was spread out, with 28.4% under the age of 18, 9.7% from 18 to 24, 28.6% from 25 to 44, 20.0% from 45 to 64, and 13.3% who were 65 years of age or older.  The median age was 34 years. For every 100 females, there were 84.2 males.  For every 100 females age 18 and over, there were 76.3 males.

The median income for a household in the city was $29,125, and the median income for a family was $35,333. Males had a median income of $25,804 versus $19,479 for females. The per capita income for the city was $12,772.  About 12.8% of families and 15.0% of the population were below the poverty line, including 14.8% of those under age 18 and 27.1% of those age 65 or over.

2020 census

As of the 2020 United States census, there were 1,225 people, 424 households, and 245 families residing in the city.

Education

Higher education 
Georgia Military College has an extension campus near Zebulon City Hall.

Pike County School District 
The Pike County School District serves Zebulon. The school district has one Pre-K school (lottery funded), a primary school (K–2), an elementary school (3–5), a middle school (6–8), a ninth grade academy and two high schools. In 2004, the district had 156 full-time teachers and over 2,800 students. In 2021, it reported 3,500 students.
Pike County Pre-K School
Pike County Primary School
Pike County Elementary School
Pike County Middle School
Pike County Ninth Grade Academy
Pike County High School
Zebulon High School

Notability and popular culture appearances
Singer/songwriter Vic Chesnutt was raised in Zebulon. In 2006, he was ranked by Robin Hilton of NPR as the #5 living songwriter.

The courthouse in Zebulon can be seen in the 1983 television film Murder in Coweta County starring Andy Griffith and Johnny Cash. The 1984 movie Tank starring James Garner was filmed in and around the town.

References

Cities in Georgia (U.S. state)
Cities in Pike County, Georgia
County seats in Georgia (U.S. state)